Ben Franklin Harris (December 17, 1889 – April 1, 1927) was a Major League Baseball pitcher who played for the Kansas City Packers in  and . He died at age 37 in 1927 from tongue cancer.

References

External links

1889 births
1927 deaths
Baseball players from Nashville, Tennessee
Kansas City Packers players
Major League Baseball pitchers
Topeka Jayhawks players
Lyons Lions players
Denver Grizzlies (baseball) players
Denver Bears players
Wichita Jobbers players
People from Donelson, Tennessee
Deaths from oral cancer
Deaths from cancer in Missouri